Yabancı Damat (literally: The Foreign Groom) is a Turkish television drama distributed by Erler Film with 106 episodes in total. It deals with the relationship between a young Greek man Niko and a Turkish girl Nazlı, and the problems (and especially the prejudices) encountered in an intercultural marriage. Its comedic tone and play on historic Greco-Turkish antagonism made it a huge hit in both Turkey and Greece, as well as making stars out of the leading actors. The episodes are shot in Turkey and Greece. The music is Turkish and Greek.

The series ran from November 12, 2004 till June 15, 2007 on the Turkish channel Kanal D Friday evenings at 20:00 hrs.

Plot

Nazlı is the daughter of a conservative Turkish father Kahraman, who is a famous baklava maker in Gaziantep. Her grandfather Memik Dede is a Greco-Turkish War veteran. Then there is Kadir (Engin Akyürek), son of Ökkeş, the business partner of Kahraman. Kadir is engaged to Nazli. He is kind-hearted and loves her very much. But Nazli falls in love with Niko. Niko, whose parents are immigrants from Istanbul, is the son of a wealthy Greek ship owner Stavro. Nazlı and Niko meet in Bodrum, fall in love at first sight and decide to marry. The comedy starts when Niko goes to Gaziantep to ask for her father’s agreement to the marriage. Historical enmity between the two nations makes it very hard and both families oppose their marriage in the beginning. Finally, Nazlı and Niko form a family and settle in Istanbul. They meaningfully name their son Ege ("Aegean"), the sea between Turkey and Greece. The families visit each other several times for various reasons and get so closer. Niko's spinster aunt Katina gets married with a Turkish man, much exasperating her mother Efthalia. Even the initial hatred between the older members of the families, Memik Dede and Efthalia, turns to a romantic affair. As Nazli and Niko enjoy their time, Kadir and Niko’s secretary Anna fall in love. Kadir and Anna get engaged, but circumstances make them to separate as Anna’s modeling profession is not accepted by Kadir’s family. Stella (another foreigner) is the next woman in Kadir’s life. They are happily married and living peacefully, when again tragedy strikes. Stella unable of having kids leaves and asks for a peaceful divorce from Kadir as she wants him to live a complete life with family and children. Finally, Kadir is married to a Turkish girl Aysel. They have a daughter whom he names ‘Nazli’.

Cast
The cast of the series is mostly made of experienced Turkish actors and actresses.

Nazlı's family
 Nehir Erdoğan - Nazlı
 Erdal Özyağcılar - Kahraman, Nazli's father, a famous baklava maker in Gaziantep
 Sumru Yavrucuk - Feride, Nazli's mother
 Binnur Kaya - Nazire, Nazli's older sister
 İlker Aksum - Ruşen, Nazire's husband
 Arif Erkin Güzelbeyoğlu - Memik Dede, Nazli's grandfather
 Ozan Uğurlu - Mustafacan, Nazli's younger brother
 Ege Uslu - Nazli and Niko's older son

Niko's family
 Özgür Çevik - Niko (Nikos)
 Mazlum Kiper - Stavro (Stavros), Niko's father
 Ayla Karaca - Eleni, Niko's mother
 Tülin Oral - Eftelya (Euthalia), Niko's grandmother
 Nilgün Belgün - Katina, Niko's aunt
 Ege Uslu - Nazlı and Niko's older son
 Meryem Adda - Nazli and Niko's  baby-daughter

Kadir's family
 Engin Akyürek - Kadir, former lover of Nazlı
 Zeki Alasya - Ökkeş, Kadir's father and Kahraman's business partner
 Seray Gözler - Hayriye, Kadir's mother
 Asli Altaylar - Aysel, Kadir's last wife
 Nazli  - Aysel's and Kadir's baby-daughter

Minor characters
 Yeliz Akkaya - Esra Akman, Niko’s assistant
 Güzin Alkan - Döne, maid of Nazlı's family
 Natalia Doussopoulos - Anna, Kadir’s girlfriend
 Katerina Moutsatsou - Stella, Kadir's ex-wife
 Binnaz Ergin - İkramiye, housekeeper of Nazlı's and Niko's house in Istanbul
 Yılmaz Gruda - Celayir Usta, Ökkeş’s baklava master
 Ahmet Uz - Hikmet
 Şinasi Yurtsever -  Hamit, Döne's husband
 Nazlı Tosunoğlu - Rabia, Ruşen's mother
 Kayra/İlayda/Talıa Songur - Nazire's and Ruşen's daughters
 Alara Bozbey - Natalia, Nursemaid

Locations
The episodes are shot in Bodrum, Gaziantep, Istanbul in Turkey and on the Greek Islands of Symi, Santorini, Crete and in Athens.

International broadcast
The Greek channel Mega TV broadcast it from July 4, 2005. The first season was shown on daily basis at 23:00 hrs, the second season was shown every Monday at 21:00. The third season was split, half of the episodes where shown Saturdays of 2007 at 21:00 and the other half episodes are shown in 2008, every Saturday at 17:00. The series used to have great success, especially when the first season was shown. The ratings of the third season are very low, so the channel decided to move the series in the evening schedule. The Bulgarian channel bTV broadcasts it since August 29, 2009 daily at 17:00 hrs. with the title Brak s chujdenets (Marriage with a Foreigner). The series was also dubbed into Arabic with the title Al-Gharib ("الغريب", The Stranger) and aired in March 2009 on MBC+ Drama.

Awards
 2006 "Best TV Series of the Year" award by the Turkish Association of Radio and Television Journalists along with two other TV series.
 2004: "Best Supporting Actress" award by 1st Annual Primetime Beyaz Inci Awards 
 2004: "Best Actor" (nominated) by 1st Annual Primetime Beyaz Inci Awards
2004: "Best Actress" (nominated) by 1st Annual Primetime Beyaz Inci Awards
2004: "Best Music" by 1st Annual Primetime Beyaz Inci Awards
2004: "Best Actor in a Supporting Role" (nominated) by 1st Annual Primetime Beyaz Inci Awards
2004: "Best Director" by 1st Annual Primetime Beyaz Inci Awards

Series overview

Release

References

External links
 Official Website
 Yabanci Damat at the Internet Movie Database

Comedy-drama television series
2004 Turkish television series debuts
2007 Turkish television series endings
Turkish comedy television series
Turkish drama television series
2000s Turkish television series
Kanal D original programming
Turkish television series endings
Television shows set in Istanbul
Television shows set in Greece
Television series produced in Istanbul